Greig is a surname and given name. The surname is of Scottish origin and is derived from a shortened form of the personal name Gregory and Greg. As a given name, Greig is of English and Scottish origin. This name is a short form of the names Gregory or Gregor. In some cases it is derived from the surname of the same spelling. A variant form of the given name is Gregg.

Surname
 Aleksey Greig (1775-1845), Russian Admiral, son of Samuel Greig
 Andrew Greig (b. 1951), Scottish writer
 Andy Greig (1893 - after 1925), Scottish footballer
 Brian Greig (b. 1966), Australian politician
 Charlotte Greig (1954-2014), Maltese journalist, singer and songwriter
 Doug Greig (1928-2003), Canadian soccer player
 David Cunningham Greig (1922-1999), British Geologist
 Edvard Grieg, Norwegian composer and pianist, whose family name was of Scottish origin and originally spelled "Greig"
 Flos Greig, the first female barrister and solicitor in Australia
 Gavin Greig, the collector of Scottish folk songs
 Geoffrey Greig, English cricketer
 Geordie Greig (born 1960), English journalist and newspaper editor
 Ian Greig, English cricketer, brother of Tony Greig
 J. G. Greig, English cricketer
 Sir James William Greig (1859–1934), British barrister and Liberal Party politician
 John Greig, Scottish footballer
 Keith Greig, Australian rules footballer
 Mark Greig (born 1970), Canadian ice hockey player
 Mel Greig, Australian radio and television personality
 Samuel Greig, Scottish-born Russian Admiral
 Tamsin Greig (b. 1966), British actress
 Teresa Billington-Greig (1877-1964), the suffragette who created the Women's Freedom League
 Thomas E. Greig (1921-1999), American businessman and politician
 Tony Greig (1946–2012), South Africa-born English cricketer and cricket commentator
 W. D. O. Greig (1851-1942), English footballer

Given name
 Greig Fraser (b. 1975), Australian cinematographer 
 Greig Laidlaw (b. 1985), Scottish Rugby Union international 
 Greig Nori (b. 1962), Canadian producer and musician
 Greig Pickhaver (b. 1948), Australian actor and comedian
 Greig Smith, Los Angeles City Council member

See also
 Grieg (surname)

References

English-language masculine given names
English-language surnames
English given names
Scottish given names
Scottish surnames